Lahore Fashion Week is the second largest fashion week event in Pakistan (after the Karachi Fashion Week) which is held annually in the city of Lahore, also regarded as Pakistan's cultural and fashion capital. Famous Pakistani fashion designer Mehmood Bhatti has praised the fashion week and called it an answer to the "futile efforts of extremists to enforce fear." ‘Pantene Bridal couture Week Style 360 day 1 was held at Pearl Continental hotel Lahore on 15 October, In Style 360 Bridal couture Week day One
Total of 13 Fashion Designers and 33 models participated in the fashion show.
Bridal couture Week 360 2011 was sponsored by Pantene one of the leading Shampoo company in Pakistan and organized by Style 360 Pakistan's only Fashion  Channel. Apart from the traditional fashion show, Bridal couture Week day 1 included a dance performance by Fia which was much appreciated by everyone.

References

Fashion events in Pakistan
Lahore
Annual events in Pakistan
Fashion weeks